Carey Alvin Spicer Jr. (April 23, 1909 – December 5, 1996) was a two-time All-American basketball player at the University of Kentucky. He captained Adolph Rupp's first team in 1930–31, and became Rupp's first All-American. He was also an All-Conference Quarterback for the football team who played varsity tennis and ran track. Rupp called him "one of the greatest athletes in University of Kentucky history."

Early life
Spicer, was born in Lexington, Kentucky on April 23, 1909. His father was a grocer. He, his brother William and his sister Stella were natural athletes who went on to play college basketball. William and Carey at Kentucky, and Stella at Georgetown College, one of the few schools with a women's college basketball program. Spicer was one of the top football and basketball players ever at the old Lexington High School. He made the All-State team in basketball, and 1926 All-State Tournament team and was president of his senior class.

Basketball
Spicer was a two-time All-American and three-time All-Conference forward for the University of Kentucky basketball team. He won All-American honors under two different coaches, first John Mauer in 1929 and then Adolph Rupp in 1931. He was captain of Adolph Rupp's first basketball team in 1930-31 and was the team's leading scorer. That season, he scored 27 points in a 42-37 victory over Vanderbilt. He also set the then Southern Conference record for most points in a tournament game when he scored 22 points against Florida.

In 1991, Spicer was in the second class of Kentucky basketball players to have his jersey retired, along with Louie Dampier and Jack Givens.

Records
 Southern Conference - Most points, tournament game (22), record surpassed by Joe Holup in 1954

Other sports
Spicer was an excellent all-around athlete. As a halfback, and quarterback in football he set several records that stood for more than 40 years. He scored 11 touchdowns and 75 points for Kentucky to lead the Southern Conference in scoring in the 1930 season. He also played tennis and ran track at Kentucky.

Records
 Kentucky, most touchdowns, season (11), surpassed by Babe Parilli in 1950
 Kentucky, most points, season (75), surpassed by Moe Williams in 1995

Later life
After graduating, Spicer coached basketball and football at Georgetown College in Georgetown, Kentucky from 1931 to 1935. The Tigers basketball program went 12–43, including 0-3 versus Kentucky, over four seasons of basketball and a 13-20-2 record over four seasons of football. During World War II he was a captain in the United States Army. After returning from the war, he went to work for Spalding Sporting Goods Company selling equipment for a sport that he was never very good at—golf. Later, in 1979, he opened his own business, Carey Spicer and Associates in Carmel, IN, which continued to sell golf and sporting equipment. He married Katherine Drury, his high school sweetheart, and they had two children. Spicer died December 5, 1996 from cancer.

References

1909 births
1996 deaths
All-American college men's basketball players
American football halfbacks
American football quarterbacks
American men's basketball players
Basketball coaches from Kentucky
Basketball players from Lexington, Kentucky
College men's basketball head coaches in the United States
Georgetown Tigers football coaches
Georgetown Tigers men's basketball coaches
Kentucky Wildcats football players
Kentucky Wildcats men's basketball players
Players of American football from Lexington, Kentucky
Power forwards (basketball)
Sportspeople from Lexington, Kentucky
United States Army officers
United States Army personnel of World War II